Samuel Leech Maskrey (February 11, 1854 – April 1, 1922) was an American outfielder in Major League Baseball. He played five seasons in the majors, from 1882 to 1886, for the Louisville Eclipse/Colonels and Cincinnati Red Stockings. His brother, Harry Maskrey, was his teammate on the 1882 Eclipse.

After spending the 1887 to 1889 seasons playing minor league baseball, Maskrey was part of a contingent sent to England in 1890 by Albert Spalding at the behest of the newly-formed professional National League of Baseball of Great Britain. He was signed by Preston North End Baseball Club as player-coach and was club captain. This organization had sent a letter to the American Spalding requesting help in establishing a league. They requested eight to ten players to coach and convert the existing players (whose primary game was usually soccer). Spalding sent a skilled manager, Jim Hart, along with players Maskrey, William J. Barr, Charles Bartlett, and J. E. Prior. Maskrey was the only one of the players who had played in the majors to that point, and he stayed there for one season as a player-manager of Preston North End.

Following his sojourn in England, Maskrey returned to the U.S. minor leagues in 1891, where he played for the Tacoma team in the Pacific Northwestern League. After spending the 1892 season with the Atlanta Firecrackers of the Southern Association, part of which he spent as a player-manager, he retired and went into the hotel business with his brother Harry.

References

External links

1854 births
1922 deaths
19th-century baseball players
Major League Baseball outfielders
Louisville Eclipse players
Louisville Colonels players
Cincinnati Red Stockings (AA) players
Topeka Capitals players
Milwaukee Cream Citys players
Milwaukee Brewers (minor league) players
American expatriate baseball players in the United Kingdom
Des Moines Prohibitionists players
Atlanta Firecrackers players
Baseball players from Pennsylvania
People from Mercer, Pennsylvania